These are some of the notable events relating to politics in 2010.

Events

May 

May 11 – David Cameron announces he has formed a coalition government between the Conservative Party and Liberal Democrats forming the Cameron–Clegg coalition, following the resignation of the former Labour Party Prime Minister Gordon Brown.

June
 June 24 – Julia Gillard is sworn in as the first female Prime Minister of Australia after challenging her predecessor Kevin Rudd in a leadership ballot that resulted in his defeat.

August
 August 21 – The Australian Labor Party led by Prime Minister Julia Gillard defeats the Australian Liberal Party led by Opposition leader Tony Abbott in the 2010 Australian federal election. Prior to the close defeat it was the first hung parliament since the 1940 election.

Deaths

June 

 June 23 – Peter Walker, Baron Walker of Worcester - Former Welsh Secretary, Energy Secretary and Conservative Party Life peer of the House of Lords.

October
 October 27  – Néstor Kirchner - UNASUR Secretary-General and ex Argentine president

References

 
Politics by year
21st century in politics
2010s in politics